The Migrant and Seasonal Agricultural Worker Protection Act (AWPA or MSPA) (public law 97-470) (January 14, 1983), codified at 29 U.S.C. §§ 1801-1872, is the main federal law that protects farm workers in the United States and repealed and replaced the Farm Labor Contractor Registration Act (P.L. 88-582).

The AWPA provides federal labor protections in the areas of labor contracting and recruitment, payment of wages, record keeping, housing, transportation, working conditions, and compliance with "working arrangements." The Act also requires farm labor contractors to register with the United States Department of Labor.

Summary
It was enacted in 1983 to assist migrant and seasonal farm workers. It provides migrant and seasonal workers with social protections for transportation, housing, with pay, and work-related protections to safeguard them against occupational hazards and ensure better working conditions. Certain farm operators who are exempt from the Fair Labor Standards Act are also exempt from the MSPA. Farm labor contractors are not exempt from the MSPA and must register with the U.S. Department of Labor.

According to the Congressional State of Purpose, the goal of this policy is to "remove the restraints on commerce caused by activities detrimental to migrant and seasonal agricultural workers; to require farm labor contractors to register under this chapter; and to assure necessary protections for migrant and seasonal agricultural workers, agricultural associations, and agricultural employers."

Under the law, there are some major requirements for agricultural employers:

To secure a certificate of registration from the U.S. Department of Labor before commencing any contracting of farm laborers.
To provide proof that transportation vehicles meet standards and are insured.
 To show that housing meets state and federal safety and health standards
 To provide written information about wages, hours, workers' compensation, working conditions, and housing during the recruitment process.
 To maintain written payroll records and provide employee with written pay statement.

Agricultural employers and associations are responsible for MSPA compliance. If agricultural employers violate these provisions, there are specified penalties.

Farm workers
Between 1 and 3 million people, mainly from Mexico, migrate each year to work on American farms. According to the 1998 National Agricultural Workers Survey, 81% of all farm workers were born outside the US and of those 95% were born in Mexico. Of the farm workers in America nearly 85% of them spoke Spanish as their native language,  and farm workers average just years of education. Of foreign-born farm workers, only about 10% spoke English fluently.

Migrant workers come to work in jobs undesirable to many American citizens because of the often substandard working conditions and low pay. Many people leave their families behind in their home country with promises of returning with the fruits of their labor and the hope of a better life. However, the median income among these workers is a meager $7,500 a year, so they often do not have enough to bring back to their families.

Among migrant workers, approximately 52% are not allowed to work in the U.S. That brings with it the threat of deportation, along with the isolation and alienation that inevitably occurs when one moves to a foreign place, which often leads to workers feeling trapped on the farm at which they work.

Pesticide use

A pesticide can be defined a "any substance or mixture of substances used to destroy, suppress or alter the life cycle of any pest." It is used to kill competing plants (herbicides) and control harmful insects (insecticides). Also, they can kill or suppress the growth of microorganisms, like bacteria, viruses, and fungi that live near crops (antimicrobial pesticides). The ultimate goal of controlling the growth of pests is to increase the crop yields.

The compounds are made up of two main types of ingredients: active, which control pests, and inert, which improve performance of the pesticides. For example, some inert ingredients are responsible for increasing the shelf life while other inert ingredients act as solvents for the active ingredients. It is important to know that not all inert ingredients are safe. In fact, adding inert ingredients to pesticides requires permission from the Environmental Protection Agency.

Pesticide use has increased significantly since the 1960s, from 196 million pounds in 1960 to 516 million pounds in 2008. Most pesticides are used in agriculture (72 percent), but 13 percent are used in homes and gardens. Glyphosate atrazine, metam sodium, and acetochlor are the most commonly used active ingredients in the US. The EPA estimated that between 180 and 185 million pounds of glyphosate were applied in 2007 while 28 and 33 million of pounds of acetochlor were applied in 2007.

The act is important to protect migrant workers from the detrimental health effects associated with occupational hazards of working in agriculture. Migrant workers can be affected by pesticides depending on the toxicity, the intensity or the duration of their exposure. Workers may come into contact with chemicals via inhalation, ingestion, or skin contact. Short-term exposure risks include eye and skin irritation and skin sensitivity. More intermediate effects from repeated exposure include neurotoxicity or nerve damage. Negative health effects are magnified and become increasingly serious after prolonged and repeated lifetime exposure, which include cancer, endocrine disruptions, and reproductive complications Potential genetic disorders and developmental disorders can occur from fetal exposure during pregnancy.

References 
(1) Economic Research Service & USDA. Migrant and Seasonal Agricultural Worker Protection Act of 1983. Retrieved from http://www.ers.usda.gov/media/536059/ah719e_1_.pdf.
 Cornell University Law School. 29 U.S. Code § 1801 - Congressional Statement of Purpose. Legal Information Institute. Retrieved from https://www.law.cornell.edu/uscode/text/29/1801.
 Gonzalez, E. (2015). Migrant Farm Workers: Our Nation’s Invisible Population. Extension. Retrieved from http://www.extension.org/pages/9960/migrant-farm-workers:-our-nations-invisible-population#.VjDhrstVikp.
 U.S. Department of Labor. (2000). Findings from the National Agricultural Workers Survey (NAWS) 1997-1998. Retrieved from http://www.doleta.gov/agworker/report_8.pdf..
 Environmental Protection Agency. (2015). Basic Information about Pesticide Ingredients. Retrieved October 25, 2015, from http://www2.epa.gov/ingredients-used-pesticide-products/basic-information-about-pesticide-ingredients
 Environmental Protection Agency. (2013). What are pesticides and how do they work? Retrieved October 25, 2015, from http://www.epa.nsw.gov.au/pesticides/pestwhatrhow.htm
 Grube, A., Donaldson, D., Kiely, T., & Wu, L. (2011). Pesticides industry sales and usage. US EPA, Washington, DC.
 Fernandez-Cornejo, J., Nehring, R., Osteen, C., Wechsler, S., Martin, A., & Vialou, A. (2014). Pesticide Use in US Agriculture: 21 Selected Crops, 1960-2008. Economic Research Service, United States Department of Agriculture, 40-49.
 Environmental Protection Agency (EPA).  (2007.)  Pesticides: Topical and Chemical Fact Sheets.  Assessing Health Risks from Pesticides.  Retrieved from http://www.epa.gov/pesticides/factsheets/riskassess.htm

External links
 U.S. Code – Official text of the law.
 "Unfinished Harvest" – NGO Report on the law's 30th anniversary.
 

1983 in law
97th United States Congress
United States Department of Labor